The following are the records of Mongolia in Olympic weightlifting. Records are maintained in each weight class for the snatch lift, clean and jerk lift, and the total for both lifts by the Mongolian Weightlifting Federation.

Current records

Men

Women

Historical records

Women (1998–2018)

References

External links

records
Mongolia
Olympic weightlifting
weightlifting